Payneham Cemetery, located on Marian Road, Payneham South, South Australia was established by the Argent Street Primitive Methodist church with the first burial occurring in 1864.

History
The land (Allotment 107 of Section 285) was purchased by the Argent Street Church Trustees from Henry Ellis in 1846. A Primitive Methodist church was opened in 1859 and burials commenced in the cemetery in 1864.

There has been significant grave reuse, to the extent that the cemetery was considered not eligible for State heritage protection in 1990, on 26 October 2006 the 1864 cemetery reserve, all headstones and monuments was added to the local register.

Interments
 Gustave Adrian Barnes (1877–1921) – artist
 Fanny Kate Boadicea Cocks (1875–1954) – policewoman and welfare worker
 Henry John Congreve (Harry) (1829–1918) – adventurer, journalist and preacher
 Sir Darcy Rivers Warren Cowan (1885–1958) – medical practitioner and advocate of effective treatment of tuberculosis
 John Creswell (1858–1909) – company secretary
 Samuel Forsyth (1881–1960) – Methodist minister and Ida Muriel Forsyth née Brummitt (1884–1953) – nurse and community worker
 Richard Witty Foster (1856–1932) – storekeeper, farmer and politician
 Alfred Edward Gerard (1877–1950) – merchant and Aboriginal welfare worker
 Reginald Charles (Rex) Ingamells (1913–1955) – poet and editor
 John Grenfell Jenkin (1865–1966) – Methodist minister
 Robert Kelly (1845–1920) – pastoralist and politician
 William Stanley Kelly (1882–1969) – sheep-breeder and agriculturalist
 Andrew Alexander Kirkpatrick (1848–1928) – printer and politician
 Serena Lake (1842–1902) – evangelist and suffragist
 Sir Edward Lucas (1857–1950) – draper and politician
 James Waddell Marshall (1845–1925) – merchant
 Robert Mitchell (1851–1929) – Presbyterian clergyman
 Elizabeth Webb Nicholls (1850–1943) – social reformer
 Samuel William Pearce (1848–1932) – prospector
 George Searcy (1855–1927) –  Australian sportsman, sports official and accountant
 Brian Wibberley (died 1944) – minister of Kent Town Methodist Church

References

External links
 
 

Cemeteries in South Australia
1864 establishments in Australia